Driebergen-Rijsenburg is a town in the municipality Utrechtse Heuvelrug in the central Netherlands, in the province of Utrecht.

It is the home of Michelin starred restaurant La Provence.

Transportation

Driebergen-Zeist railway station

References

External links
 website
Map
Statistics in Dutch  (pdf) - with (towards the end) a map showing the neighborhoods and (a few pages further) the population figures etc. as well as the grouping into quarters
Local newsreports

Municipalities of the Netherlands disestablished in 2006
Populated places in Utrecht (province)
Former municipalities of Utrecht (province)
Utrechtse Heuvelrug